Vladimir Vujasinović (born 3 July 1989) is a Serbian football goalkeeper, who most recently played for Liberia.

Playing career 
Vujasinović began his career in 2005 with Bačka. In 2008, he signed with Big Bull Radnički, and helped them win the Serbian League Vojvodina in 2010. In 2009, he was loaned to FK Inđija and won the Serbian First League. In 2011, he had a stint with FK Radnički Šid before returning to Bačka Palanka.  In 2013, he was loaned out to Canada to play with Burlington SC of the Canadian Soccer League. In 2014, he was awarded the CSL Goalkeeper of the Year award. In 2016, he was loaned to Milton SC, and made his debut on October 7, 2016 in a match against York Region Shooters. At the beginning of 2017, Vujasinović joined Limón F.C.

References

External links
 
 Vladimir Vujasinović stats at utakmica.rs 
 
 

1989 births
Living people
People from Bačka Palanka
Association football goalkeepers
Serbian footballers
FK Inđija players
FK Radnički Šid players
OFK Bačka players
Halton United players
Milton SC players
Serbian First League players
Serbian SuperLiga players
Serbian expatriate footballers
Serbian expatriate sportspeople in Canada
Expatriate soccer players in Canada
Canadian Soccer League (1998–present) players
Expatriate footballers in Costa Rica
Serbian expatriate sportspeople in Costa Rica
Serbian League players